An alcohol-free or non-alcoholic drink, also known as a temperance drink, is a version of an alcoholic drink made without alcohol, or with the alcohol removed or reduced to almost zero. These may take the form of a non-alcoholic mixed drink or non-alcoholic beer, and are widely available where alcoholic drinks are sold.

Scientific definition

Low-alcoholic drink
Sparkling apple cider, soft drinks, and juice naturally contain trace amounts or no alcohol. Some fresh orange juices are above the UK 'alcohol free' limit of 0.05% ABV, as are some yogurts and rye bread.

Ethanol distillation is used to separate alcoholic drinks into what are advertised as non-alcoholic drinks and spirits. Distilled wine produces low alcohol wine and brandy (from brandywine, derived from Dutch brandewijn, "burning wine"). Distilled beer may be used to produce low-alcohol beer and whisky.

However, alcoholic drinks cannot be further purified to 0.00% alcohol by volume by distillation. Most drinks labeled "non-alcoholic" contain 0.5% ABV, as it is more profitable than distilling it to 0.05% ABV often found in products sold by companies specializing in non-alcoholic drinks.

Ethical issues

Alcohol is legal in most countries of the world where a drinking culture exists. In countries where alcohol is illegal, similar non-alcoholic drinks are permitted. The definition of "alcohol-free" may vary from country to country. The term "non-alcoholic" (e.g., alcohol-free beer) is often used to describe a drink that contains 0.0% ABV.

However, most drinks advertised as "non-alcoholic" or "alcohol free" sold by countries with zero tolerance with state-run liquor monopoly, actually contain alcohol. In the European Union, the labels of drinks containing only more than 1.2% ABV must state the actual alcoholic strength (i.e., show the word "alcohol" or the abbreviation "alc." followed by the symbol "% vol.").

Alcohol is a psychoactive drug and some critics say that the label "non-alcoholic" is misleading, due to the presence of small amounts of alcohol in most drinks labelled as such, and a threat to recovering alcoholics.

Non-alcoholic mixed drinks

Non-alcoholic cocktails often resemble alcoholic cocktails without any liquor. They can be a blend of fresh fruit juices, syrups, cream, herbs and spices, or can use non-alcoholic spirits. These drinks are designed specifically for those who are sober, and are particularly favored over cocktails by teetotalers, underage persons, drivers, pregnant women, and others who choose drinks that are alcohol-free.

Fruestas
The Woman's Christian Temperance Union publishes several recipes for fruestas, which are nonalcoholic fruit drinks for large functions, such as proms and weddings. As a locution, fruesta drinks are etymologically derived from "fruit" and "fiesta", being a portmanteau of the two words.

Legal definitions

EU
In the European Union, the labels of drinks containing more than 1.2% ABV must state the actual alcoholic strength (i.e., show the word "alcohol" or the abbreviation "alc." followed by the symbol "% vol.").

Denmark
The government of Denmark have decided to change the alcohol free legal definition from 0.1% alcohol by volume to 0.5%.
This is due to the different taste of 0.5% than of 0.1%.

Finland
Non-alcoholic beverage means a beverage which contains a maximum of 1.2 percentage by volume ethyl alcohol.

Italy
Non-alcoholic beer, termed as "birra analcolica", is regulated as equal to or less than 1.2% ABV.

Sweden
Systembolaget defines alcohol-free as a drink that contains no more than 0.5% alcohol by volume.

United Kingdom
Licensing laws only place restrictions on the sale or consumption of drinks with an alcohol content of over 0.5%.

Japan
In Japanese Liquor Tax Law,  are defined as equal to or more than 1% ABV, so that drinks that are less than 1% ABV are not treated as alcoholic drink. However, organization for making self‐imposed regulation, defines  as drinks that 0.00% ABV.

Norway
An alcohol free drink is defined as under 0.7% alcohol by volume.

Russia
Non-alcoholic drinks are defined as containing less than 0.5% abv in general, or less than 1.2% abv if based on a fermentation product, including drinks like kefir, kvass and medovukha. This also includes low-alcohol beers by definition.

United States
A malt drink that contains less than 0.5% alcohol by volume does not have to be labeled.

List of traditional non-alcoholic drinks

 Aam panna
 Aguas frescas
 Aguapanela
 Almdudler
 Apfelschorle
 Atole
 Ayran
 Baesuk
 Bandrek
 Bandung
 Barley water
 Birch sap
 Blåbärssoppa
 Bread Drink
 Cendol
 Chalap
 Champurrado
 Champús
 Chass
 Chicha morada
 Cholado
 Chai
 Coffee
 Egg cream
 Egg nog
 Elderflower cordial
 Es bir
 Falooda
 Sugar cane juice
 Ginger ale
 Ginger beer
 Ginger tea
 Hawaiian Punch
 Horchata
 Hot chocolate
 Hwachae
 Jindallae hwachae
 Kava 
 Kefir
 Kombucha
 Kvass
 Lassi
 Licuado
 Mattha
 Mazamorra
 Milkshake
 Mocochinchi
 Mote con huesillo
 Nectar
 Orange drink
 Orange soft drink
 Peanut punch
 Roasted barley tea
 Root beer
 Sarsaparilla
 Sharbat
 Shikanjvi
 Smoothie
 Subak hwachae
 Sujeonggwa
 Switchel
 Tea
 Tereré
 Thadal
 Yerba Mate
 Water
 Yuja hwachae

See also
 Alcohol law
 Alcohol-free bar
 List of non-alcoholic cocktails
 Non-alcoholic malt drinks

References

Further reading